Chimichurri is an uncooked sauce used both as an ingredient in cooking and as a table condiment for grilled meat. Found originally in Argentinian, Uruguayan, Paraguayan and occasionally Chilean cuisine the sauce is now ubiquitous in much of South America.  The sauce comes in a green (chimichurri verde) and red (chimichurri rojo) version. It is made of finely chopped parsley, minced garlic, olive oil, oregano and red wine vinegar or lemon juice. It is somewhat similar to Moroccan chermoula.

Etymology

The name may be a variant of Spanish chirriburri 'hubbub', ultimately perhaps from Basque zurrumurru 'noise, rumor'. Another theory connects it to Basque tximitxurri 'hodgepodge', 'mixture of several things in no particular order'; many Basques settled in Argentina in the 19th century.

Various, almost certainly false etymologies purport to explain the name as a corruption of English words, most commonly "Jimmy['s] Curry", "Jimmy McCurry", or "gimme curry", but no contemporary documentation of any of these stories has been found.

Preparation
Chimichurri is always made from finely chopped parsley, but other seasonings used vary. Inclusion of red wine vinegar, garlic, salt, black pepper, oregano, red pepper flakes, and sunflower or olive oil is typical (plus a shot of hot water). Some recipes add shallot or onion, and lemon juice. Chimichurri may be basted or spooned onto meat as it cooks, or onto the cooked surface of meat as it rests. Chimichurri is often served as an accompaniment to asados (grilled meats). It may be served with grilled steaks or roasted sausages, but also with poultry or fish.

Other uses of the term
In the Dominican Republic, chimichurri or chimi is a hamburger topped with chopped cabbage and salsa golf.

In the cuisine of León, Mexico, chimichurri is a pizza topping of mayonnaise, mustard, chile de árbol, white vinegar, garlic, oil and salt. This dressing has an orange hue and is very popular in the city.

See also

 Bondiola sandwich
 List of dips
 List of sauces
 Persillade
 Salmoriglio
 Wasakaka
 Mojo (sauce)

References

External links 

Argentine cuisine
Sauces
Marinades
Uruguayan cuisine